Cadell or Cadel is an old Welsh personal name derived from the Latin Catullus. As a surname, it derives from the Welsh patronymic "ap Cadell". Notable people with the name include:

Given name

Middle Ages
 Cadell Ddyrnllwg, King of Powys c.447–460, founder of royal house of Powys
 Cadell ap Brochfael, King of Powys 773–808)
 Cadell ap Gruffydd, Prince of Deheubarth 1143–1153
 Cadell ap Rhodri, Prince of Seisyllwg 854–909

Modern era
Cadel Evans (born 1977), Australian cyclist

Surname
 Alexander Cadell (1900-1928), English cricketer
 Arnau Cadell (12th–13th century), Catalan sculptor
 Ava Cadell (born 1956), American actress
 Cyngen ap Cadell (c.790-855), Welsh king
 Elizabeth Cadell (1903-1989), British novelist
 Florence St John Cadell (1877–1966), British artist
 Francis Cadell (explorer) (1822–1879), Scottish-born explorer of Australia
 Francis Cadell (artist) (1883–1937), Scottish painter
 Grace Cadell (1855–1918), one of the first female surgeons, Scottish suffragette
 Henry Cadell (1860–1934), Scottish geologist
 Hywel ap Cadell (c.880–948), Welsh king
 James John Cadell (1843-1919), Australian politician
 Jean Cadell (1884–1967), Scottish actress
 Jessie Cadell (1844-1884), English novelist
 Meryn Cadell, Canadian writer and singer
 Nest ferch Cadell, daughter of Cadell ap Brochfael 
 Paddy Cadell (born 1999), Irish hurler
 Richard Cadell (born 1969), British magician and puppeteer
 Robert Cadell (1788-1849), Scottish bookseller
 Selina Cadell (born 1953), British actress
 Simon Cadell (1950–1996), British actor
 Thomas Cadell the elder (1742–1802), English bookseller and publisher
 Thomas Cadell (politician) (1831-1896), Australian politician
 Thomas Cadell (1835–1919), Scottish recipient of the Victoria Cross
 William Archibald Cadell (1775-1855), Scottish industrialist and mathematician
 William Cadell (1708-1777), Scottish industrialist

Places
 Cadell, South Australia, named after Francis Cadell
 Cadell and Blyth Floodplains, Northern Territory, Australia
 Cadell Training Centre, prison in Cadell, South Australia
 Cadell Fault, a geological feature of Southern New South Wales and northern Victoria, Australia

See also
Caddel
Caddell

Welsh masculine given names